The Saab Sonett is an automobile manufactured between 1955 and 1957 and again between 1966 and 1974 by Saab of Sweden. Sonetts share engines and other components with Saab 93, 95 and 96 of the same era. It was mainly intended for the lucrative American export market and was only offered intermittently in the Swedish domestic market (model years 1968 and 1972).

The first prototype, now known as the Sonett I, is a two-seat, open-top, lightweight roadster racer which, ten years later, evolved into the commercially distributed Sonett models II, V4, and III.

Sonett I 

In the 1950s, Rolf Mellde—a Saab engine developer and race enthusiast—along with Lars Olov Olsson, Olle Lindkvist, and Gotta Svensson, designed a two-seat roadster prototype in a barn in Åsaka, near Trollhättan (the site of the main Saab manufacturing facility). The limited research-and-development project, with a total budget of only , became known as the Sonett, a name derived from the Swedish phrase Så nätt den är ("how neat it is", or more literally "it's so neat") supposedly said by Mellde when faced with the prototype.

The Saab Sonett, also called the Super Sport or Saab 94, was introduced on 16 March 1956 at Stockholm's Bilsalong (motor show). Featuring a three-cylinder 748 cc two-stroke engine generating  and a  aluminium box-style chassis from Swedish designer Sixten Sason, the Sonett I was an advanced low-weight  racer based on aircraft design concepts.

However, race competition rules changed, permitting modified production cars into race classes that Saab had envisioned for its purpose-built Sonett, and the economic and marketing viability of the project faded.

Only six Sonett I vehicles were made between 1955 and early 1957, all RHD. The original prototype, known as "No. 1" and built with a manually-crafted glass-reinforced plastic (GRP, or "fiberglass") body, served as the reference model for the other five cars. An extremely rare vehicle, only two Sonetts I exist in the United States. Chassis number 2 was in the GM Heritage Center Collection but it was sold to Saab Cars North America (SCNA) after GM's 2009 bankruptcy. After Saab, too, went bankrupt in 2012, it was sold on to the Saab Heritage Car Museum USA in South Dakota.

Sonett II 

In the early 1960s, Björn Karlström, an aircraft and automotive illustrator, and Walter Kern, an engineer at Massachusetts Institute of Technology, independently suggested a two-seat roadster with Saab components and a two-stroke engine called the "Shrike". Two prototypes were developed: the Saab MFI13 by Malmö Flygindustri, and the Saab Catherina by Sixten Sason.

After some modifications, the MFI13 was put into limited production (28 units) in 1966 as the Sonett II, manufactured at the Aktiebolaget Svenska Järnvägsverkstäderna (ASJ) in Arlöv. Inside Saab, it was designated model 97. A further 230 units were assembled in 1967, but as the two-stroke engine became increasingly uncompetitive in the US market, a switch to the Ford Taunus V4 engine was made in the middle of the 1967 production year, and the model was renamed the Sonett V4. Apart from the engine and related drivetrain, the Sonett II and Sonett V4 share much of their componentry. The additional weight did require some strengthening of the chassis and suspension pieces, and the wheels were half an inch wider than the four-inch units used on the Sonett II. Approximately 50 percent of the Sonett II production has survived, preserved or maintained by museums, collectors, and race enthusiasts.

Like the Sonett I prototype, the Sonett II fiberglass body was bolted to a box-type chassis with an added roll-bar to support the hard top. The entire front hood section hinged forward to allow easy access to the engine, transmission, and front suspension. All Sonett IIs were left hand drive (LHD).

Designed as a race car, the Sonett II competed successfully against other small European sports cars, including the Austin-Healey Sprite and Triumph Spitfire, in Sports Car Club of America (SCCA) races of the period. Due to low production volume, Sonett IIs were disqualified from certain competitions. By 1967, the two-stroke engine failed to meet US emission control standards. In 2011 a two-stroke Sonett II achieved  at the Bonneville Salt Flats. Of the 28 Sonett IIs manufactured in 1966 all were equipped with 841cc three cylinder two-stroke engines. SAAB produced serial numbers 29 through 258 with the two-stroke engine, serial number 259 was the first Sonett to have the V4 engine.

All Sonett II transmissions had a freewheel that could be engaged and disengaged while in motion via a pull handle down near the throttle pedal. The freewheel was required in the normal (non-oil pump engines) SAAB two stroke engines but not in the racing engines that had an oil injection system fed from a supply tank, nor in the Sonett V4 since it had a four-stroke engine with the common recirculating pressure lubrication.

The Škoda-engined ÚVMV 1100 GT was based on the Sonett II.

Sonett V4 

When Saab started using the Ford Taunus V4 engine in their 95, 96, and Monte Carlo models, an upgrade for the low-volume Sonett II became economically feasible. The Sonett V4 was introduced with a 1,500 cc Ford V4 engine in the middle of the 1967 model year starting with serial number 259. A new "bulge" hood, designed by Gunnar A. Sjögren, was required to clear the larger V4 engine, with a slight right offset to avoid obstructing the driver's view. This asymmetrical hood shape, criticized by both the automotive press and within Saab itself, contributed to the motivation for the 1970 Sonett III redesign.

The V4's dashboard was wrinkle finished black, unlike the wooden panel used in the Sonett II.

Following the low-volume 1966–67 Sonett IIs, Saab ramped up Sonett V4 production to meet minimum SCCA requirements, assembling 70 units in the 1967 transition year, 900 units in 1968, and 640 units in the final 1969 production year—a total of 1,610 Sonett V4 vehicles. The 1969 models can be recognized by their taller seat backs and by having a lid for the glove compartment, while the heater was also made somewhat more efficient.

While the Sonett V4 was assembled in Sweden, nearly the entire production was exported to the United States, with an MSRP of between US$3,200 and US$3,800 (US$ to US$ in today's dollars). In addition to its unusual fiberglass body, the Sonett V4 featured advanced safety features for its day, including a roll bar, three-point seat belts, and high-back bucket seats to protect against whiplash injury. Sonett V4s also sported a few oddities compared to standard American sports cars like e.g. Corvette, such as front wheel drive; a freewheeling clutch that disengaged automatically whenever the accelerator pedal was no longer pressed, and a column-mounted shifter, rather than a typical floor-mounted shifter.

In spite of lackluster Saab marketing, unusual features, and quirky design, the Sonett V4 found a niche market in the US, propelled by successful SCCA racing performances of the Sonett II. Its primary competitors were British roadsters, including the MG Midget and MG MGB, the Triumph TR5, the TVR Grantura and the Austin-Healey Mark IV.

The Clean Air Act of 1970 prompted engineering modifications to the Ford V4 emission control system that were difficult to reconcile with the Sonett II/V4 body style which then led to the Sonett III redesign.

Sonett III 

The 1970 redesign of the Sonett V4, named the Sonett III, was initially undertaken by Sergio Coggiola, but Gunnar A. Sjögren altered it to fit the existing Sonett II chassis without expensive manufacturing-line changes. Hinged rear-window glass replaced the Sonett II/V4 rear compartment hatch door. With the mandate for a "bulge-less" hood, the engine compartment opening evolved into a small front popup panel, resulting in more limited access than in the Sonett V4. Extensive engine work required the removal of the entire front hood section.

To help adapt the car to US market tastes, the Sonett III featured a floor-mounted shifter (instead of the Sonett V4 column-mounted shifter) and optional dealer-installed air conditioning. The Sonett III's hidden headlamps were operated manually using a lever. US safety regulations required new low speed impact proof bumpers after 1972, significantly detracting from its Italian-inspired design. All Sonett III were LHD.

While the 1970 and 1971 model years initially had the same 1500 cc Ford Taunus V4 engine as the Sonett V4, emission control requirements reduced the available horsepower.

Disappointing sales, especially during the 1973 oil crisis, led Saab to end production in 1974. A total of 8,368 Sonett IIIs were manufactured between 1970 and 1974.

SAAB also used the Sonett III for test builds powered by a Rankine cycle steam engine. One of the test cars survived and was at auction in Stockholm in July 2019.

Cancelled new Sonett 
The Sonett name was planned to be revived as the production version of the Saab PhoeniX concept. Designed by Jason Castriota as an affordable halo car for Saab, it would have been a 2+2 sports car producing up to 400 hp in its highest form, and used the new Phoenix platform that would have underpinned the next generation 9-3 and 9-1 compact. These projects were cancelled with the dissolution of Saab in 2012.

References

External links 

 Saab Sonett Super Sport

Sonett
Front-wheel-drive sports cars
Cars introduced in 1955
1960s cars
1970s cars
Group 4 (racing) cars